The War Lover is a 1962 British war film directed by Philip Leacock and written by Howard Koch loosely based on the 1959 novel by John Hersey, altering the names of characters and events but retaining its basic framework. It stars Steve McQueen, Robert Wagner and Shirley Anne Field.

The war itself is not the most important element of the film. Instead it focuses on the character of Captain Buzz Rickson  played by McQueen and his determination to serve himself and get what he wants – in the process antagonising everyone.

Plot
Capt. Buzz Rickson (Steve McQueen) commands a B-17 bomber in Britain during the World War II. On a mission over Germany, Rickson's commanding officer, Col. Emmet (Jerry Stovin), aborts the bomber group's attack due to cloud cover. Instead of obeying his superior, Rickson dives under the clouds and completes the mission. He believes Emmet will tolerate his insubordination because he's the group's best pilot. And although the group's flight surgeon is uncertain whether Rickson is hero or psychopath, Rickson's crew, especially his co-pilot, Lt. Ed Bolland (Robert Wagner), trust his intuitive flying skills.

Between missions, Rickson and Bolland meet a young Englishwoman, Daphne Caldwell (Shirley Anne Field). Although she is attracted to both pilots, she chooses Bolland. They soon fall in love. Meanwhile, Bolland becomes increasingly disillusioned with Rickson. The crew's popular navigator, Lt. Marty Lynch (Gary Cockrell), is pressured to transfer to another crew after he questions Rickson's behaviour. Lynch even tells Bolland, "Give Rickson a bomber and a machine gun, and he could be on either side." Lynch is soon killed in action. Bolland takes it hard and blames Rickson. Later, while on liberty, Rickson makes a move on Daphne, visiting her in her London flat after Bolland has returned to the base. Daphne rejects his forceful advances, telling him she loves Bolland.  

The next morning, on a mission over Germany, Colonel Emmet's plane is shot down, leaving Rickson in command of the group. Rickson's plane drops its bombs on target, but there's a cost. The plane is badly shot up by Messerschmitts, killing one of the crew. Further, its bomb bay doors are stuck open with one armed bomb still on its rack. As the plane nears the English coastline, an air-sea rescue team is contacted and the crew bails out -- all except Rickson, who is determined to bring the bomber back to base. Instead, he crashes into the white cliffs on the Kent coast. Afterwards, Bolland reports Rickson's death to Daphne in Cambridge. She concludes: "It's what he always wanted." The pair of lovers walk away together.

Cast
 Steve McQueen as 'Buzz' / Buzz Rickson
 Robert Wagner as 'Bo' / Ed Bolland
 Shirley Anne Field as Daphne 
 Gary Cockrell as Lynch: Crew of 'The Body'
 Michael Crawford as Junior' / Junior Sailen: Crew of 'The Body'
 Bill Edwards as Brindt: Crew of 'The Body'
 Chuck Julian as Lamb: Crew of 'The Body'
 Robert Easton as Handown: Crew of 'The Body'
 Al Waxman as Prien: Crew of 'The Body'
 Tom Busby as Farr: Crew of 'The Body'
 George Sperdakos as Bragliani: Crew of 'The Body' 
 Bob Kanter as Haverstraw: Crew of 'The Body'
 Jerry Stovin as Emmet
 Ed Bishop as Vogt (as Edward Bishop)
 Richard Leech as Murika
 Bernard Braden as Randall
 Sean Kelly as Woodman 
 Charles De Temple as Braddock 
 Neil McCallum as Sully 
 Viera as Singer 
 Justine Lord as Street Girl 
 Louise Dunn as Hazel 
 Arthur Hewlett as Vicar

Production
The War Lover was filmed in Britain at RAF Bovingdon in Hertfordshire, RAF Manston in Kent, around Cambridgeshire (including in the grounds of King's College, Cambridge), and at Shepperton Studios in Surrey.

Shirley Ann Field says she turned down the lead in A Kind of Loving to make the movie. "I chose the option to go to Hollywood, who wouldn't?... Although I have to say I don't think director Philip Leacock was strong enough... I just think it could have been better." Field's casting was announced in July 1961.
 
Three Boeing B-17 Flying Fortress bombers formed the main aerial component in the film and were composed of one B-17G and two postwar PB-1W Coast Guard rescue aircraft located in the United States. After extensive modifications, the three warbirds flew the arduous transatlantic crossing to Britain. Martin Caidin, who would later write the novels on which the TV series The Six Million Dollar Man and the film Marooned were based, was one of the pilots who flew the B-17s for the film. Caidin chronicled the adventures of the crossing in the book Everything But The Flak.

The War Lover was shot in 1961 and released in the United States on 25 October 1962.  The film opened in London in June 1963. Some short but rare footage of actual air combat is included – especially the attacking Messerschmitt Bf 109G armed with 20 mm cannon firing at the B-17s. The film also makes use of the crash landing footage from the 1949 film Twelve O'Clock High.

Mike Reilly, a stuntman doubling for Wagner, was killed during the production of The War Lover when he fell to his death in a parachuting accident.

In 2003, Sony Pictures colourised the film but to date the colour version has never been released on video.

Reception
The War Lover was unfavourably compared to other wartime aviation epics like Twelve O'Clock High  (1949). Bosley Crowther of The New York Times focused on the lack of interesting characters in the film. "But the fellows who sit in the cockpit of the one plane on which the actions center are a dull pair and are rendered even duller by poor acting and weak direction. Steve McQueen is the emotionally-mixed-up pilot who tries to steal his co-pilot's girl. Robert Wagner is the co-pilot and Shirley Anne Fields is the girl. Altogether they make what at best is an average drama of love and jealousy into a small and tepid expose of one man's absurd cantankerousness."

In a similar vein, the review of The War Lover in Variety noted, "...the central character emerges more of an unappealing symbol than a sympathetic flesh-and-blood portrait.... The scenario seems reluctant to come to grips with the issue of this character’s unique personality – a 'war lover' whose exaggerated shell of heroic masculinity covers up a psychopathic inability to love or enjoy normal relationships with women."

References
Notes

Citations

Bibliography

 Brown, Gary. "The War Lover." Warbirds Worldwide Special Edition, December 1997.
 Caidin, Martin. Everything But The Flack. New York: Popular Library, 1964.
 Dolan, Edward F. Jr. Hollywood Goes to War. London: Bison Books, 1985. .
 Harwick, Jack and Ed Schnepf. "A Buff's Guide to Aviation Movies". Air Progress Aviation, Volume 7, No. 1, Spring 1983.
 Orriss, Bruce. When Hollywood Ruled the Skies: The Aviation Film Classics of World War II. Hawthorne, California: Aero Associates Inc., 1984. .
 Wagner, Robert and Scott Eyman. Pieces of My Heart: A Life. New York: Harper Collins, 2008. .

External links
 
 
 
 
 PBase: Filming The War Lover
 Aerovintage.com: The War Lover
 
 Channel4 (UK) review

1962 films
1960s war drama films
British war drama films
British black-and-white films
British World War II films
British aviation films
Films about the United States Army Air Forces
Films directed by Philip Leacock
Films scored by Richard Addinsell
Films set in Cambridge
Films set in Leipzig
Columbia Pictures films
1962 drama films
1960s English-language films
1960s American films
1960s British films